Marina Barrage is a dam in southern Singapore built at the confluence of five rivers, across the Marina Channel between Marina East and Marina South.

First conceptualised in 1987 by then prime minister Lee Kuan Yew to help achieve greater self-sufficiency for the country's water needs, the barrage began construction on 22 March 2005, and was officially opened on 31 October 2008 as Singapore's fifteenth reservoir, the Marina Reservoir. 

It provides water storage, flood control and recreation. It won a Superior Achievement Award from the American Academy of Environmental Engineers in 2009. It also turned the previously salt water Singapore River into fresh water for the first time in its history.

Purpose
The S$3 billion project, with $226 million for the structure itself, turned Marina Bay and Kallang Basin into a new downtown freshwater Marina Reservoir. It provides water supply, flood control and a new lifestyle attraction. After its opening, the Marina Barrage quickly became a tourist attraction not long after.

By keeping out seawater, the barrage formed Singapore's 15th reservoir and first reservoir in the city. Marina Reservoir, together with the future Punggol and Serangoon reservoirs, increased Singapore's water catchment areas by one-sixth of Singapore's total land area.

Marina Barrage also acts as a tidal barrier to keep seawater out, helping to alleviate flooding in high-risk low-lying areas of the downtown districts such as Chinatown, Jalan Besar and Geylang.

When it rains heavily during low-tide, the barrage's crest gates will be lowered to release excess water from the coastal reservoir into the sea. If heavy rain falls during high-tide, the crest gates remain closed and giant drainage pumps are activated to pump excess water out to sea.

As the water in the Marina Basin is unaffected by the tides, the water level will be kept constant, making it ideal for all kinds of recreational activities such as boating, windsurfing, kayaking and dragonboating.

Impact
The building of the Marina Barrage required the relocation of Clifford Pier from Collyer Quay to Marina South (see Marina South Pier).

It has proved to be a tourist attraction. Marina Barrage is open for viewing 24/7. The information counter is open from 9.00am to 9.00pm daily. Tours for a maximum capacity of 80 people to the Visitor Centre can be arranged prior to arrival.

From 2012 onward, it played host to annual public youth community and cosplay event EOY Cosplay Festival.

Awards
The Marina Barrage was conferred the Superior Achievement Award – the highest honour of the competition for the best project entry - at the AAEE Annual Awards Luncheon held in Washington, DC, USA on 6 May 2009. The Marina Barrage beat 33 other entries to take home the top prize in this year's competition organised by the American Academy of Environmental Engineers (AAEE), becoming the second project outside of USA to win the award, in the last decade.

Gallery

See also
 EarthFest Singapore

References

External links

 Official Page
 Interactive Virtual Reality Tour of Marina Barrage
Paragraph 2
Diagram 2, Drainage Pump
Sub-heading:Flood Control, Para 3
AAEE website 
AAEE 
ACN Newswire 

Dams in Singapore
Marina Bay, Singapore
Marina East
Marina South
Barrages (dam)
Dams completed in 2008
2008 establishments in Singapore